Biguglia is a commune in the Haute-Corse department of France on the island of Corsica. It is near the town of Bastia.

Population

Sport
Biguglia is the home of Championnat de France Amateurs 2 club, ÉF Bastia.

See also 
 Communes of the Haute-Corse department
 Railway stations in Corsica

References

External links
Official website 

Communes of Haute-Corse
Haute-Corse communes articles needing translation from French Wikipedia